Gandana Mane is a 2007 Kannada movie directed by S. Mahendar and starring Shiva Rajkumar and Gowri Munjal.

Cast
Shiva Rajkumar as Raja 
Gowri Munjal as Priya
Hema Chaudhary
Avinash as Sitaram 
Doddanna
Ashalatha as Raja's step-mother
Ramesh Bhat
Karibasavaiah
Tennis Krishna
Vaijanath Biradar

Soundtrack

The music was composed by V. Manohar and released by Anand Audio Video.

Reception 
A critic from The Times of India wrote that "It is a treat to watch Shivaraj Kumar's brilliant acting. Gauri is excellent and Avinash is in fine form. B A Madhu's dialogues and camerawork by Sundarnath Suvarna are added attractions. V Manohar's music is pleasant". A critic from Rediff.com opined that "All in all, an ordinary fare".

References

Films scored by V. Manohar
2000s Kannada-language films
Films directed by S. Mahendar